(meaning "soft wool wrapper") were plain shawls made with soft goat hair fibre (() meaning "wool") that were produced in Punjab in the early 19th century.

See also 

 List of English words of Persian origin
 Lahore

References 

Textile arts of Pakistan
Shawls and wraps
Textiles